The sixth season of Cold Case, an American television series, began airing on September 28, 2008, and concluded on May 10, 2009. Season Six regular cast members include Kathryn Morris, Danny Pino, John Finn, Thom Barry, Jeremy Ratchford and Tracie Thoms.

Cast

Episodes

References

2009 American television seasons
2008 American television seasons
Cold Case seasons